Brandenburg an der Havel is a town in Brandenburg, Germany, which served as the capital of the Margraviate of Brandenburg until it was replaced by Berlin in 1417.

With a population of 72,040 (as of 2020), it is located on the banks of the River Havel. The town of Brandenburg provided the name for the medieval Bishopric of Brandenburg, the Margraviate of Brandenburg and the current state of Brandenburg. Today, it is a small town compared to nearby Berlin but was the original nucleus of the former realms of Brandenburg and Prussia.

History

Middle Ages

The castle of Brenna, which had been a fortress of the Slavic tribe Stodoranie, was conquered in 929 after the Battle of Lenzen by the Saxon King Henry the Fowler. It was first mentioned as Brendanburg in 948. The name of the city is a combination of two words braniti – to protect/defend and bor – forest/wood. The town remained under Saxon control only until 983, when a Slavic rebellion was successful.

During the next 170 years the area was ruled by Slavic Princes of the Hevelli tribe. The last of them, Pribislav, died in 1150. From 1153/1154 to 1157 Brenna was part of the Slavonic Duchy of Kopanica, a fief of the Kingdom of Poland.

After 1157 CE, Albert I leading one of the Wendish Crusades settled here and became the first margrave of Brandenburg. The town was restricted to the western bank of the Havel until 1196, when it was extended to the eastern side. The parts on either side of the river were regarded as three towns (Old Town, New Town and Brandenburg cathedral district) for centuries.

In 1314–1315 the Old and New Towns joined the Hanseatic League. In the Thirty Years' War (1618–1648) the towns suffered plundering and destruction which led to a loss of power; Potsdam became the new capital, and the court left the town of Brandenburg. In 1715, Old Town and New Town were merged to form a single town. In 1928, the Brandenburg cathedral district was added.

Modern history

In the late 19th century Brandenburg an der Havel became a very important industrial center in the German Empire. Steel industries settled there, and several world-famous bicycle brands such as Brennabor, Corona and Excelsior were manufactured in the city. A world-famous toy industry was also established. With a giant industrial complex, the Deutsche Reichsbahn (German Imperial Railways) was located in Brandenburg-Kirchmöser during the time between the two world wars and the time of the former GDR. The city's excellent transport infrastructure was a big advantage.

In 1933/34, a concentration camp, one of the first in Nazi Germany, was located on Neuendorfer Straße in Brandenburg Old Town. 
After closing this inner city concentration camp, the Nazis used the Brandenburg-Görden Prison, located in the suburb of Görden. Later the old gaol became the Brandenburg Euthanasia Centre where the Nazis murdered people with mental diseases, including children. This programme later came to be known as "Action T4" because of the Berlin address, Tiergartenstraße 4, the headquarters of this planned and well-organized forced euthanasia organisation. Brandenburg an der Havel was one of the first locations in Nazi Germany where the Nazis experimented with murdering their victims by gas. The lessons here were later applied for mass murders in Auschwitz and other extermination camps. 
After complaints by local inhabitants about the smoke, the mobile furnaces used to burn the corpses ceased operation. Shortly after this, the Nazis closed the old prison.

In 1934, the Arado Aircraft Company (Arado Flugzeugwerke), which originated in Warnemünde, built a satellite factory in Brandenburg that began producing planes in 1935. The factory was expanded over the next five years, and produced trainers and other aircraft for the Luftwaffe during World War II. The existence of this factory was one of the reasons Brandenburg was heavily bombed in later stages of the war; by 1945, 70%  of the city was destroyed.

Friedrich Fromm, a German officer involved in the 20 July plot to assassinate Hitler, was executed here in March 1945 for his part in the plot, even though Fromm betrayed those conspirators he knew and ordered their execution.

On 25 July 1952 Plaue and Kirchmöser were incorporated in the city of Brandenburg an der Havel.

After German reunification the city's population declined from around 100,000 in 1989 to roughly 75,000 in 2005 through emigration. The migration was mainly by young people.

Demography

Transport 

The city is located on the navigable River Havel, a European Waterway, and vessels travelling through the city have a choice of two routes. The original route used the Brandenburg City Canal, a  route through the city centre that descends through the Stadtschleuse Brandenburg, but this route is constrained in size and now limited to leisure craft. Commercial traffic instead uses the Silo Canal that passes through the eastern and northern fringes of the city.

The city is located at the junction of Federal Highways 1 and 102 and the A2 autobahn is nearby. The Berlin and Magdeburg railway also runs through Brandenburg an der Havel.

The centrepiece of the city's urban public transport system is the Brandenburg an der Havel tramway network.

Sights 

The Dominsel (Cathedral Island) is the historic heart of the town. Here stands its oldest edifice: the St. Peter and Paul Cathedral. Although construction began in the Romanesque style in 1165, it was completed as a Gothic cathedral during the 14th century. While the exterior is rather austere, the cathedral surprises the visitor with its sumptuous interior, especially the painted vault of the Bunte Kapelle (Coloured Chapel) and the Wagner organ (1725), one of the most famous Baroque organs in Germany.

The Katharinenkirche (St. Catherine's Church) built in 1401 in the Neustadt is an impressive example of northern German brick Gothic architecture. The Gotthardtkirche (St. Gotthardt's Church) was built of the same material just a few years later.

Another interesting building is the Altstädtisches Rathaus (Old Town Hall), a late Gothic brick building with stepped gables and an ornate portal. In front of it stands a 5.35m high statue of the knight Roland. Made of sandstone, the statue was erected in 1474 as a symbol of the town's independence.

There is also a part of Brandenburg's medieval city wall, with four preserved watchtowers:  Steintorturm and Mühlentorturm (in the New Town), and Rathenower Torturm and Plauer Torturm (in the Old Town).

The Brandenburg Industrial Museum is an Anchor Point of ERIH, The European Route of Industrial Heritage. Brandenburg has its own theatre (Brandenburger Theater), a professional symphony orchestra (Brandenburger Symphoniker) and a wide range of local history and archaeology museums.

Notable people

 Judith of Poland, (c. 1130/35–1171/75), buried in the cathedral
 Georg Sabinus (Georg Schuler; 1508–1560), academic and rector of the University of Königsberg
 Christian Konrad Sprengel (1750–1816), theologian, botanist and naturalist
 Julius von Voss (1768–1832), officer and writer
 Friedrich de la Motte, Baron Fouqué (1777–1843), writer.
 Wilhelm Eugen Ludwig Ferdinand von Rohr (1782–1851), Prussian general
 Theodor Hosemann (1807–1875), painter, illustrator and cartoonist in Berlin
 Wilhelm Rüstow (1821–1878), freedom fighter and revolutionary, military writer and historian.
 Ludwig Chronegk (1837–1891), actor and director of the Meiningen Court Theatre
 Georg von Waldersee (1860-1932), Imperial German Army general in World War I
 Paul Matschie (1861–1926), zoologist
 Gustav Noske (1868–1946), politician (SPD), Minister of Defence between 1919 and 1920
 Paul Hausser (1880–1972), army general
 Józef Unrug (1884–1973), Polish vice admiral
 Vicco von Bülow (1923–2011), known as Loriot, comedian, film director, actor and writer
 Joachim Kemmer (1939–2000), film actor
 Angelika Barbe (born 1951), biologist

Twin towns – sister cities

Brandenburg an der Havel is twinned with:
 Ballerup, Denmark
 Ivry-sur-Seine, France
 Kaiserslautern, Germany
 Magnitogorsk, Russia

See also 
Brandenburg Euthanasia Centre
Brandenburg Gate in Berlin
Brandenburg Central Station
BSG Stahl Brandenburg
Brandenburger SC Süd 05
Nikolaus von Halem

References 

 Bevölkerungszahlen

External links 

 

 
Cathedral of Brandenburg 
Brandenburg guide 
Tramway in Brandenburg
Potsdamer Brandenburger Havelseen, Tourist information